Toronto—St. Paul's is a provincial electoral district in Ontario, Canada, that has been represented in the Legislative Assembly of Ontario since 1999.   Before the 2018 election, it was known simply as St. Paul's.

The small but densely populated riding covers the area to the north of Downtown Toronto. The riding was represented by Liberal Eric Hoskins before his abrupt resignation on February 26, 2018.

The riding was created for the 1999 election, to match the borders of the federal riding of the same name. It was carved out of the former districts of St. Andrew—St. Patrick, Eglinton, Oakwood, Dovercourt and St. George—St. David.

The riding consists of part of the Fairbank, Humewood-Cedarvale, Hillcrest-Bracondale, Wychwood Park, part of Davenport, Casa Loma, Forest Hill, Tarragon Village, Rathnelly, South Hill, Summerhill, Rosehill, Chaplin Estates, Deer Park and Davisville and part of North Toronto neighbourhoods.

Political geography
In the 2007 provincial election, the Liberals dominated most of the riding, performing the best in Fairbank in the northwest corner of the riding and in Davisville, in the east end of the riding. The Tories won most of their polls in the Forest Hill neighbourhood, and in Cedarvale. The NDP won a few polls, mostly in the south, where the riding borders the NDP riding of Trinity—Spadina.

Members of Provincial Parliament

Election results

2022 election

2018 election

2007 electoral reform referendum

References

Sources
Elections Ontario Past Election Results
Map of riding for 2018 election

Provincial electoral districts of Toronto